Daniel Saifiti (born 1 May 1996) is a Fiji international rugby league footballer who plays as a  for the Newcastle Knights in the NRL.

He has played for New South Wales in the State of Origin series.

Background
Saifiti was born in Newcastle, New South Wales, Australia. He is of Fijian and Samoan descent and moved to the Central Coast at a young age.

He played his junior rugby league for the Terrigal Sharks and The Entrance Tigers, before joining the Newcastle Knights in 2015.

Saifiti is the identical twin brother of Knights teammate Jacob Saifiti.

Playing career

2015
In 2015, Saifiti played for the Newcastle Knights' NYC team. On 2 May, he played for Fiji against Papua New Guinea, alongside his twin brother Jacob in the 2015 Melanesian Cup. During the year, he re-signed with the Newcastle club on a two-year contract.

2016
In round 1 of the 2016 NRL season, Saifiti made his NRL debut for the Knights against the Gold Coast Titans, playing alongside his brother Jacob, becoming the first twins in Australian rugby league's 108-year history to debut together. He scored a try on debut. On 7 May, he again played for Fiji against Papua New Guinea in the 2016 Melanesian Cup. On 12 May, he and his brother extended their contracts with the Knights from the end of 2017 until the end of 2018. In his 8th game of first-grade, he ran for a game-high 237 metres against the Wests Tigers.
Saifiti finished his debut season with Newcastle making 20 appearances as the club finished last on the table.

2017
Saifiti played 23 games for the Knights in the 2017 season, before having his contract extended until the end of 2020.  Newcastle would finish the year on the bottom of the table for a third straight season.

2018
Saifiti played 21 games for Newcastle in the 2018 NRL season as the club finished 11th on the table.

2019
Saifiti was selected in the starting side for Game 2 of the 2019 State of Origin series.

Saifiti was retained for Game 3 of the 2019 State of Origin series which was won by New South Wales 26-20 at ANZ Stadium.  It was the first time since 2005 that New South Wales had won back to back series.

At club level, he played 21 games for Newcastle as the club finished a disappointing 11th on the table after being expected by many to qualify for the finals.

2020
He was selected for New South Wales in the 2020 State of Origin series. He played in all three games as New South Wales suffered a 2-1 series defeat to Queensland.

2021
For round 1 of the 2021 NRL season, Saifiti was announced as a Knights co-captain alongside Jayden Brailey.

He was selected for game one of the 2021 State of Origin series. Saifiti scored his first try for New South Wales in game one as the Blues defeated Queensland 50-6. Saifiti played in the first two games during the series but was ruled out of the third due to injury. New South Wales went on to win the series 2-1.

2022
Safiti caused a shock when he ruled himself of World Cup selection for Fiji, citing covid and injury issues earlier in the year as the reason.

Saifiti played 19 games for Newcastle in the 2022 NRL season as the club missed the finals finishing 14th on the table.

References

External links

Newcastle Knights profile
NRL profile

1996 births
Living people
Australian people of Fijian descent
Australian sportspeople of Samoan descent
Australian rugby league players
Fiji national rugby league team players
New South Wales Rugby League State of Origin players
Newcastle Knights captains
Newcastle Knights players
Rugby league players from Newcastle, New South Wales
Rugby league props